Martinus may refer to:
 Martin (magister militum per Armeniam), 6th-century Byzantine/East Roman general
 Martinus (son of Heraclius), 7th-century Byzantine/East Roman co-emperor
 Martinus of Arles, doctor of theology, priest, and author on demonology and witches
 Saint Martinus or Saint Martin of Tours
 Martinus College, a secondary school in the Netherlands
 VV Martinus, a Dutch volleyball club

People with the name
 Derek Martinus (1931–2014), British television and theatre director
 Flavius Martinus, vicarius (governor) of the Roman provinces of Britain
 Martinus Beijerinck, Dutch microbiologist
 Martinus von Biberach (died 1498), theologian from Heilbronn, Germany
 Martinus Bosselaar, Dutch football (soccer) player
 Martinus Brandal, Norwegian engineer and businessman
 Martinus Dom, first abbot of the Trappist Abbey of Westmalle
 Martinus Fabri, Dutch composer of the late 14th century
 Martinus Gosia, scholar and Italian jurist, one of the Four Doctors of Bologna
 Martinus Gunnarsen, Norwegian pop singer, member of the pop duo Marcus & Martinus
 Martinus Hamconius, Dutch writer and historian
 Martinus Houttuyn, Dutch naturalist
 Martinus Nijhoff, Dutch poet and essayist
 Martinus Mosvidus, author and editor of the first book printed in the Lithuanian language
 Martinus Polonus, Dominican priest and church historian
 Martinus Rørbye, Danish painter
 Martinus Sieveking, Dutch classical composer and pianist
 Martinus Sonck, first Dutch Governor of Formosa
 Martinus Adrianus Stam, Dutch architect, interior designer, and industrial designer
 Martinus Theunis Steyn, lawyer and politician
 Martinus Thomsen, Danish mystic and spiritual teacher
 Martinus J. G. Veltman, Dutch theoretical physicist

See also 
 Marthinus
 Martin (disambiguation)
 Tinus (disambiguation)

Dutch masculine given names